Project Rio Blanco was an underground nuclear test that took place on May 17, 1973 in Rio Blanco County, Colorado, approximately 36 miles (58 km) northwest of Rifle.

The tests were conducted in fine-grain, low-permeability sandstone lenses at the base of the Fort Union Formation and the upper portion of the Mesaverde Formation.

This was the third and final natural-gas-reservoir stimulation test in the Plowshare program, which was designed to develop peaceful uses for nuclear explosives. The two previous tests were Project Gasbuggy in New Mexico and Project Rulison in Colorado.

The United States Atomic Energy Commission conducted the test in partnership with CER Geonuclear Corporation and Continental Oil Company.

A placard, erected in 1976, now marks the site where the test was conducted. The site is accessible via a dirt road, Rio Blanco County Route 29.

Devices
As the creation of tritium was of greatest concern, the three devices used were specially designed to reduce tritium production, creating less than  tritium each, primarily from the medium surrounding the devices.

References

Explosions in 1973
May 1973 events in the United States
American nuclear weapons testing
American nuclear test sites
Explosions in the United States
Peaceful nuclear explosions
Rio Blanco County, Colorado
Underground nuclear weapons testing
1973 in Colorado